The 2018 Morningside Mustangs football team was an American football team that represented Morningside University as a member of the Great Plains Athletic Conference (GPAC) during the 2018 NAIA football season.

Schedule

References

Morningside
Morningside Mustangs football seasons
NAIA Football National Champions
College football undefeated seasons
Morningside Mustangs football